Bai Lü (born September 1961) is a lieutenant general in the People's Liberation Army of China. He was a member of the 19th Central Commission for Discipline Inspection (CCDI). He was a representative of the 19th National Congress of the Chinese Communist Party.

Biography
Bai was born in Ying County, Shanxi, in September 1961. After resumption of college entrance examination in 1979, he entered Shanxi University, majoring in philosophy.

He joined the Chinese Communist Party (CCP) in August 1983, and enlisted in the People's Liberation Army (PLA) in February 1984. He was made political commissar of the 1st Division of the 1st Group Army in August 2005. In April 2008, he was assigned as director of Political Department of the 12th Group Army, and was elevated to political commissar in February 2011. He was recalled to the original 1st Group Army as political commissar in January 2013, succeeding . In July 2015, he was given the position of deputy political commissar of the Chengdu Military Region. 

He was commissioned as political commissar of the Southern Theater Command Ground Force in February 2016, concurrently serving as deputy political commissar of the Southern Theater Command. He was designated by the Central Military Commission in December 2020 to replace Fang Xiang as political commissar of the PLA Academy of Military Science.  

He was promoted to the rank of major general (shaojiang) in July 2009 and lieutenant general (zhongjiang) in July 2016.

References

1961 births
Living people
People from Ying County
Shanxi University alumni
PLA National Defence University alumni
People's Liberation Army generals from Shanxi
People's Republic of China politicians from Shanxi
Chinese Communist Party politicians from Shanxi